Athamania can refer to:

 Athamania, the area inhabited in Antiquity by the Athamanians
 Athamania, Arta, a municipal unit in the regional unit of Arta, Greece
 Athamania, Trikala, a village in the regional unit of Trikala, Greece

See also 
 Athamanes, Karditsa, a municipality in the regional unit of Karditsa, Greece